Silvio Luiz de Almeida (born 17 August 1976, in São Paulo) is a Brazilian lawyer, philosopher, university professor, and the current Minister of Human Rights and Citizenship. Recognized as one of greatest Brazilian specialist on racial issues, Almeida is chair of Luiz Gama Institute and is author of book Racismo Estrutural, Sartre: Direito e Política and O Direito no Jovem Lukács: A Filosofia do Direito em História e Consciência.

Biography
Almeida is son of couple Verônica and Lourival. His father was a football goalkeeper and was popularly known as Barbosinha in his career and as player of Sport Club Corinthians Paulista.

Almeida is Bachelor of Laws at Mackenzie Presbyterian University (1995–1999) and of Philosophy at University of São Paulo (2004–2011). He is Master of Political and Economical Laws at Mackenzie University and Doctor of Philosophy and General Theory of Laws at University of São Paulo.

Career
Silvio Almeida is lawyer since 2000, working with business law, economical and tributary law and human rights law.

From 2005 to 2019, he was professor of Philosophy of Laws and Introduction to the Study of Law at São Judas Tadeu University.

He is currently professor of the graduation course of Law and post-graduation stricto sensu in Political and Economical Law at Mackenzie Presbyterian University and professor at the Business Administration School and Law School of Getúlio Vargas Foundation.

In 2020, Almeida was visiting professor at Duke University, in the United States. At Duke, he taught courses in "Race and the Law in Latin America" and "Black Lives Matter: Brazil and United States", the last one in partnership with professor John D. French.

In 2022, he was selected as Edward Larocque Tinker visiting professor at Columbia University, in New York City, destined to prestigious intellectuals of Latin America. This same seat was occupied in previous years by intellectuals such as economist Raúl Prebisch, geographer Milton Santos, journalist Elio Gaspari, jurist , historian Lilia Schwarcz, among others. In Columbia, he administered the class of "Race, Law and Culture in Latin America".

On 22 June 2020, Almeida was interviewed in Roda Viva, on TV Cultura. His participation inspired a "book club" on social networks.

He is currently Chair of Luiz Gama Institute, a human rights organization focused in juridical defense of minorities and popular issues. Almeida actively acted in the creation of the "Pro-quotas Front" and was one the creators of affirmative action policies that were implemented in the state of São Paulo.

In 2021, he was rapporteur of the Jurists Commission of the Chamber of Deputies for the presentation of legislative proposals, specially focused on structural racism.

In 2020, he became columnist of politics on the Brazilian newspaper Folha de S. Paulo, acting suspended due to his nomination as one of the coordinators for the transition team of president-elect Luiz Inácio Lula da Silva.

Work
In his works, Almeida works with concepts of authors such as Jean-Paul Sartre and György Lukács. In his texts, he talks abouts issues such as law, politics, philosophy, political economy and racial affairs. He was responsible to popularize the concept of structural racism (proposed since the first racial critical studies in the 1960s), in which racism is conceived as arising from the own society structure. In his book, which is title after his concept, Almeida applies this issue in many subjects, such as law, ideology, the economy and politics.

Minister of Human Rights and Citizenship
On 22 December 2022, Almeida was announced as Minister of Human Rights and Citizenship of the third Lula administration, assuming office on 1 January 2023.

Weblinks
 List of scientific publications (Google Scholar). From here, a long preview to his book "Racismo estrutural" is linked.

See also
 Luís Gama

References

External links
 
 

1976 births
Living people
People from São Paulo
Mackenzie Presbyterian University alumni
Government ministers of Brazil